Roche Musique is an independent electronic music label based in Paris and founded in 2012 by DJ and producer Jean Janin, also known as Cezaire.

History 
In 2007, Cezaire met Kartell in Tours, a little town in the west of France where they both come from. As genuine music lovers, they shared the same inspiration for a refined and summery aesthetic that Roche Musique will embody afterward. Kartell would be the first artist to be signed on the label with his debut EP Riviera.

2012 was the year of "Lying Together" release, a neo-house track composed by multi-instrumentalist FKJ, also from Tours and at the moment managed by his friend Cezaire. This title revealed FKJ to the public, followed a year later by the release of his second EP, ′′Time For A Change.′′

In 2014, Cezaire got acquainted with Dabeull in Paris, an artist marked by Funk, Zouk and Disco influences. It was also the year of Romance's release, mythical EP from Darius, the electro-soul producer from Bordeaux, Darius. Still in 2014, French-californian producer Zimmer signed since 2015 releases his EP ′′Coming Of Age′′, followed by ′′Ceremony′′ a year later.
In 2016, producer and drawer Crayon joined the entity and brought out a 4 titles joint EP with Duñe, also an artist of the record label.

In an interview with the Inrocks, Cezaire explained: "We all have a base: Funk, House, Soul, Jazz, and Hip-hop music too, but the common thread of it is definitely the groove."

2017 was characterized by the release of French-New Zealander FKJ's eponymous first album French Kiwi Juice, now internationally Gold Certified and also Platinum with "Better Give U Up" single. Darius' first album Utopia was released the same year.

In 2018, several new artists were signed on the label: Katuchat; Madijuwon with his music video "Precious Things" as part of Adidas Originals projectThe Creator Source; Rivage, Kartell's pop duo with Alex Gonzalez (Superjava's guitarist); and Maydien, R&B and soul Dutch singer.

The record company is also included in the top ten best French labels, according to the media Jack, affiliated with the French television channel Canal+.

The label continues to grow and expand with the recent launch of a ready-to-wear clothing line, the creation of the sub-label Mineral Records and the online radio Source Radio.

Artists 
 FKJ
 Darius
 Kartell
 Zimmer
 Dabeull
 Crayon
 Duñe
 Cezaire
 Katuchat
 Plage 84
 Maydien
 Madijuwon
 WAYNE SNOW
 Didi Han
 Cherokee

Discography

Compilations 
 .Wave 2016
 .Wave II 2018

In 2019, the label collaborated with the French brand CHMPGN on a capsule collection named "The French Wave"9. At the occasion of the Asia Tour, it works with American brand Schott N.Y.C on their iconic jacket, the Bomber. For the international music celebration day, Roche Musique is associated with a Japanese brand Uniqlo on a capsule collection.

Sub-label 
 Mineral Records

Additional activities

Source Radio 
In February 2019, Source Radio was launched. Its programming is faithful to Roche Musique's artistic line groove and electronic. The music played on the radio is diverse: R&B, Hip-Hop, Neo-Soul, de Funk and House music. Artists of the label, relatives/social club and diggers residents of the radio present playlists and mixtapes along with exclusive content.

References

External links 
 Official website
 Beatport
 Discogs

Electronic music